William Batson (dates of birth and death unknown) was an English cricketer.  Batson was a right-handed batsman.

Batson made two first-class appearances for Northamptonshire against Surrey in the 1920 County Championship and Warwickshire in the 1921 County Championship.  In the match against Surrey at The Oval, he scored 9 runs in Northamptonshire's first-innings, before being dismissed by Percy Fender, while in their second-innings he was dismissed for a duck by the same bowler. Against Warwickshire at the County Ground, he scored 2 runs before being dismissed by Gerard Rotherham, while in their second-innings he was dismissed by Harry Howell, having scored 34 runs.

References

External links
William Batson at ESPNcricinfo
William Batson at CricketArchive

English cricketers
Northamptonshire cricketers
Date of death unknown
Date of birth unknown